Man Arenas (born Jacinto Manuel Arenas on 25 April 1966) is a motion picture production designer, art director and a comic book creator. He worked as a production designer on the animated films Help! I'm a Fish and The Gruffalo, as well as Laura's Star, among other films. He was born in Brussels, Belgium, and lives in Llanes, Spain.

Background
Man Arenas started his career in Brussels in 1988, working for the animation company S.E.P.P. in the visual development department for several animated TV series related to the most famous comic book characters. Since then, he has worked on many animated feature films for companies such as Warner Bros. Family Entertainment, A. Film A/S, Thilo Rothkirch Cartoon Film, Vanguard Animation or Studio Soi.

Filmography

Production Designer
Laura's Star
The Gruffalo
The Shark and the Piano
The Little Polar Bear 2 – The Mysterious Island

Art director
Kleiner Dodo

Set and Character designer/Workbook
The Gruffalo
Help! I'm a Fish
Space Chimps
Laura's Star

Laura's Star in China
Kleiner Dodo
The Little Polar Bear 2 – The Mysterious Island
Werner - gekotzt wird später

Layout-Artist
Help! I'm a Fish
Laura's Star
The Abrafaxe – Under The Black Flag

Background-Painter
The Gruffalo (film)

References
Spirou Magazine Archives
 Animaholic interview

External links
 Man Arenas Official Site
 Lines and colors – blog

Spanish production designers
Spanish art directors
Belgian graphic novelists
1966 births
Living people